A Walk with Love & Death is a double album and the 22nd album by American rock band Melvins, released on July 7, 2017, through Ipecac Recordings. It includes two distinct albums: Love, a fourteen-song soundtrack to a short film by Jesse Nieminen, also known as A Walk with Love & Death, and Death, made up of nine standard songs. This is the first full-length Melvins album to feature bassist Steven McDonald, who only appeared on four of the songs on their previous album, Basses Loaded. Guest musicians include Joey Santiago (Pixies), Anna Waronker (that dog.) and Teri Gender Bender (Le Butcherettes).

Track listing
All songs written by the Melvins.

Love (Original Soundtrack)

Death

Personnel

Love
King Buzzo – guitar, vocals, theremin, modular synth, assorted noise
Dale Crover – drums, vocals, assorted noise
Steven McDonald – bass, vocals, assorted noise

with
Toshi Kasai – assorted recordings, noise
Joey Santiago – special guest guitar
Anna Waronker – special guest backing vocals
James Bartlett – special guest keyboards
Tom Hazelmyer – special guest guitar

Death
King Buzzo – guitar, vocals
Dale Crover – drums, vocals
Steven McDonald – bass, vocals

with
Joey Santiago – extra guitar
Anna Waronker – backing vocals
Teri Gender Bender – backing vocals

Additional personnel
Toshi Kasai – producer, engineer
Steven McDonald – engineer
John Golden – mastering
Mackie Osborne – art

References

Melvins albums
2017 albums
Ipecac Recordings albums
Sound collage albums